The men's shot put event at the 1986 World Junior Championships in Athletics was held in Athens, Greece, at Olympic Stadium on 18 and 19 July.  A 7257g (senior implement) shot was used.

Medalists

Results

Final
19 July

Qualifications
18 Jul

Group A

Group B

Participation
According to an unofficial count, 20 athletes from 16 countries participated in the event.

References

Shot put
Shot put at the World Athletics U20 Championships